Jaboukie Young-White (born July 24, 1994) is an American stand-up comedian, actor, and writer. As an actor, he is best known for voicing Ethan Clade in Strange World (2022), the first openly gay protagonist of a Disney Animation Studios feature film.

Early life
Young-White was born to Jamaican immigrants and raised in Harvey, Illinois. He later attended Marian Catholic High School where he participated in Speech and Theatre before studying at DePaul University, where he became involved in improv comedy through the collegiate improvisation program "The Titanic Players". He ultimately left DePaul in his senior year to pursue his comedy career full-time.

Career
Young-White performed stand-up for the first time at an open mic night when he was 19; he was hired for his first stand-up gig when he was 21. He continued to perform stand-up at several bars and clubs around Chicago and New York City, and was a finalist at the 2016 NYC Devil Cup Stand Up Festival.

Beginning in late 2016, several of his memes, tweets, and posts went viral. He subsequently gained prominence on social media, particularly on Twitter and Instagram, where he grew a large following.

In 2017, he was featured on Rolling Stones "25 Under 25: Meet the Young Musicians, Actors, Activists Changing the World" list. The following year, he was included in Vultures "20 Comedians You Should and Will Know" list. In 2020, Young-White was placed on BET's "Future 40" list, which is a list of "40 of the most inspiring and innovative vanguards who are redefining what it means to be unapologetically young, gifted & black". Since 2017, he has performed stand-up twice on The Tonight Show Starring Jimmy Fallon.

As of 2018, he writes for the Netflix television shows Big Mouth and American Vandal. In October of that year, he was hired as a correspondent on The Daily Show; he made his first appearance opposite Trevor Noah on October 11, 2018, and left in 2021.

In early 2019, Young-White was negotiating to be a lead in an untitled Bo Burnham and Amy York Rubin film alongside Danielle Macdonald.

On Martin Luther King Day (January 20, 2020), Young-White was temporarily banned from Twitter for posting a tweet posing as the FBI and claiming that they were responsible for the activist's assassination.

On March 23, 2020, Twitter again suspended Young-White after he changed his display name and icon to that of the CNN Breaking News account, and tweeting: "BREAKING: Joe Biden is not DEAD. He just getting some dick. We've all been there cnn.com", thus making it appear as though CNN had posted the tweet. His account was restored less than a day later. However, he was subsequently stripped of his verified status.

In 2021, Young-White starred in the film Dating and New York. He also appeared opposite Joaquin Phoenix in the film C'mon C'mon and had a recurring role in the television series Only Murders in the Building. He voiced the lead role of Truman in the animated series Fairfax.

On June 10, 2021, it was announced that Young-White would be teaming up with Issa Rae and her production company Hoorae to develop the book The Gang's All Queer: The Lives of Gay Gang Members by Vanessa R. Panfil into a series for HBO. He will write and executive produce the project.

On July 20, 2021, it was announced that Young-White would be writing the script for an upcoming animated feature inspired by music of the late rapper Juice Wrld.

In 2022, Young-White had a recurring role in Rae’s television show Rap Sh!t. He also voice acted in the Disney+ series Baymax! and voiced main character Ethan Clade in the Disney animated feature Strange World.

On September 30, 2022, Young-White released his debut single “BBC” via Interscope Records under the moniker "jaboukie."

Personal life
In late 2017, Young-White came out as queer during his first appearance on The Tonight Show Starring Jimmy Fallon. He clarified that he identifies as gay in his second appearance on the program in late 2018.

He is of Jamaican descent but often jokes that he is Italian. He has two brothers, Javaughn and Javeigh. He is an uncle to Adeya, the child of his brother Javaughn and singer Kehlani. He has a Rottweiler named Callaloo.

Filmography

Film

Television

Web

Discography

Singles
 "bbc" (2022)
 "ROCKWHYLER" (2022)

Music videos

References

Further reading
 
Notes

External links

1994 births
21st-century American comedians
American people of Jamaican descent
American television writers
Comedians from Illinois
DePaul University alumni
Place of birth missing (living people)
American gay actors
American gay writers
LGBT African Americans
Gay comedians
LGBT people from Illinois
Living people
American male television writers
Male actors from Chicago
People from Harvey, Illinois
Screenwriters from Illinois
21st-century American screenwriters
21st-century American male writers
21st-century African-American writers
American male film actors
American male television actors
American male voice actors
21st-century American male actors
African-American male writers
American LGBT comedians